Gobiodon is a genus of gobies also known as coral gobies or "clown gobies" (which can also mean the related genus Microgobius).  Generally, coral gobies, unlike the rest of the family Gobiidae, are not burrowers, but instead prefer to inhabit the branches of certain Acropora or similar hard corals.

As a group, they have a general fusiform shape and are small, most ranging about 6 cm, though there are exceptions. 

Gobiodon burdigalicus from the Burdigalian (Miocene) of southwestern India is the first fossil (otoliths) record of this genus.
 Gobiodon acicularis Harold & R. Winterbottom, 1995 (Needlespine coral goby)
 Gobiodon albofasciatus Sawada & R. Arai, 1972 (Whitelined coral goby)
 Gobiodon aoyagii Shibukawa, T. Suzuki & Aizawa, 2013
 Gobiodon ater Herler, Bogorodsky & T. Suzuki, 2013 (Black coralgoby)
 Gobiodon atrangulatus Garman, 1903
 Gobiodon axillaris De Vis, 1884
 Gobiodon bilineatus  Herler, Bogorodsky & T. Suzuki, 2013 (Two-lined coralgoby)
 Gobiodon brochus Harold & R. Winterbottom, 1999
 Gobiodon ceramensis (Bleeker, 1853)
 Gobiodon citrinus (Rüppell, 1838) (Poison goby)
 Gobiodon fulvus Herre, 1927
 Gobiodon fuscoruber Herler, Bogorodsky & T. Suzuki, 2013 (Brown-red coralgoby)
 Gobiodon heterospilos Bleeker, 1856
 Gobiodon histrio (Valenciennes, 1837) (Broad-barred goby)
 Gobiodon irregularis Herler, Bogorodsky & T. Suzuki, 2013 (Rufous coralgoby)
 Gobiodon micropus Günther, 1861
 Gobiodon multilineatus H. L. Wu, 1979
 Gobiodon oculolineatus H. L. Wu, 1979
 Gobiodon okinawae Sawada, R. Arai & T. Abe, 1972 (Okinawa goby)
 Gobiodon prolixus R. Winterbottom & Harold, 2005
 Gobiodon quinquestrigatus (Valenciennes, 1837) (Five-lined coral goby)
 Gobiodon reticulatus Playfair (fr), 1867 (Reticulate goby)
 Gobiodon rivulatus (Rüppell, 1830) (Rippled coral goby)
 Gobiodon spilophthalmus Fowler, 1944
 Gobiodon winterbottomi T. Suzuki, Ko. Yano & Senou, 2012
 Gobiodon burdigalicus Carolin, Bajpai, Maurya & Schwarzhans, 2022 (otolith-based fossil species)

References

 
Gobiinae